This is a list of notable dam removal projects in the United States. Dams are listed if they have been purposefully removed as physical impediments to free-flowing rivers and streams. Dams that have been decommissioned or simply failed are not included unless they were later removed.

Dam removal takes many forms, and some removals may leave structures behind or alter the natural course of a river.

According to the non-profit advocacy organization American Rivers, 1,951 dams were removed in the United States between 1912 and 2021. The peak year was 2018, which saw 111 removals. Pennsylvania removed 364 dams in this period, more than any other state. Mississippi is the only state with no documented dam removals.

Completed removals

Planned removals

References

Dam removals
-Removals